Bixley Ward is a ward in the north east area of Ipswich, Suffolk, England. It returns three councillors to Ipswich Borough Council.

It is designated Middle Layer Super Output Area Ipswich 009 by the Office of National Statistics. It is composed of 5 Lower Layer Super Output Areas.

Ward profile, 2008
Bixley Ward is located on the eastern edge of Ipswich. In 2005 it had a population of about 7,100. A high proportion of its residents living alone and it also had a high proportion of older people and of single person pensioner households.

Councillors
The following councillors were elected since the boundaries were changed in 2002 Names in brackets indicates that the councillor remained in office without re-election.

Prior to 2002

References

Wards of Ipswich